Bluewashing (a word with similar connotations to "whitewash" and "greenwash") is term used to describe deceptive marketing that overstates a company's commitment to responsible social practices. It can be used interchangeably with the term greenwashing but has a greater focus on economic and community factors. Alternatively, it could be phrased as a way that companies hide the social damage that their policies have caused.

Active disinformation is a tool that companies use to make their goods or services more attractive to their consumers and shareholders.

Terminology 
Bluewashing is a relatively new term that is still being established. It has generally been accepted to be a spin on greenwashing with a greater focus on social and economic responsibility, but the actual definition varies in different academia.

Bluewashing was first used in relation to the United Nations and their Global Compact. A report found that 40% of corporate members who volunteered for the compact did not use its ten principles to make any policy reforms. The compact is non-binding and the United Nations has publicly stated that it does not have the resources to monitor the bodies who are supposedly participating in it. Therefore, concerns were raised that participating companies were using the compact as a way to "blue wash" their reputation aka improve public perception of their morals without legitimately introducing any policy reforms. The companies who joined were accused of using the United Nations' "excellent social reputation" to improve their own standing. The word blue was inspired by the colour of the United Nations' flag.

Other interpretations have been made in the digital domain. Van Dijk and co-authors use the term in the context of human rights such as privacy. Blue-washing here refers to the minimal instrumental use by organizations of supposed right-protecting measures like privacy by design without adequate checks, in order to portray themselves as more privacy-friendly than is factually justified. The colour blue refers to first-generation human rights as civic and political freedoms, often called blue rights, which can be contrasted with second-generation economic, social and cultural rights called red rights, and third-generation environmental rights called green rights (see three generations of human rights). Luciano Floridi uses the term in the context of ethics and also defines it as a digital alternative to its counterpart, greenwashing. He describes bluewashing as a form of misinformation that deceives consumers into thinking a corporation is more digitally ethical than it actually is. This is usually achieved by vague or unsubstantiated claims in a company's advertisements. The key example given is that of an AI; he notes that in many cases, it would be cheaper to persuade people that an AI meets ethical considerations rather than legitimately ensuring the AI meets them.

Consumer impact 
The impact of bluewashing is markedly similar to the impact of greenwashing. Ensuring that consumers believe that a company is ethically and morally responsible raises a positive attitude toward the company. This can result in increased consumer loyalty, higher market shares and a willingness to pay higher prices for their products. However, the presence of bluewashing and greenwashing has been linked with an increase of consumer distrust. Consumers are becoming increasingly aware of the deceptive marketing practices, which can lead them to automatically doubt claims of social responsibility.

Societal impact 
As bluewashing consists of false or misleading claims, instances of it have the potential to obscure the true facts of a situation.

References

Corporate jargon
Corporate social responsibility
Neologisms articles with topics of unclear notability
Neologisms